Colby is a given name.

Notable people with the given name "Colby" include

A
Colby Armstrong (born 1982), Canadian ice hockey player

B
Colbie Bell (born 1971), American wrestler
Colby Bishop (born 1996), English footballer
Colby Bockwoldt (born 1981), American football player
Colby Burnett, American game show contestant
Colby Buzzell (born 1976), American soldier and journalist

C
Colbie Caillat (born 1985), American singer-songwriter
Colby Cameron (born 1990), American football player
Colby Carthel (born 1976), American football coach
Colby Cave (1994–2020), Canadian ice hockey player
Colby Chandler (disambiguation), multiple people
Colby Mitchell Chester (1844–1932), American admiral
Colby Coash (born 1975), American politician
Colby Cohen (born 1989), American ice hockey player
Colby Corino (born 1996), Canadian-American professional wrestler
Colby Covington (born 1988), American mixed martial artist

D
Colby Donaldson (born 1974), American television personality

F
Colby Fainga'a (born 1991), Australian rugby union footballer
Colby French, American actor
Colby Fulfer (born 1978), American politician

G
Colby Genoway (born 1983), Canadian ice hockey player
Colby Gossett (born 1995), American football player

H
Colby Howard (born 2001), American stock car racing driver

J
Colby Jones (born 2002), American basketball player

K
Colby Keller (born 1980), American visual artist

L
Colby Lewis (born 1979), American baseball player

M
Colby Miller (born 1980), American video jockey
Colby Minifie (born 1992), American actress

O
Colby O'Donis (born 1989), American singer-songwriter

P
Colby Parkinson (born 1999), American football player
Colby Pearce (born 1972), American cyclist
Colby Pridham (born 1987), Canadian ice hockey player

Q
Colby Quiñones (born 2003), Puerto Rican footballer

R
Colby Raha (born 1994), American motocross racer
Colby Rasmus (born 1986), American baseball player
Colby Robak (born 1990), Canadian ice hockey player

S
Colby Schwartz (born 1974), American politician
Colby Slater (1896–1965), American rugby union footballer
Colby Starck, American drummer
Colby Stevenson (born 1997), American skier

V
Colby Vokey (born 1965), American lawyer

W
Colby Wadman (born 1995), American football player
Colby Ward (born 1964), American baseball player
Colby Wedgeworth (born 1985), American musician
Colby James West (born 1985), American skier
Colby Williams (born 1995), Canadian ice hockey player
Colby Wooden (born 2000), American football player

Fictional characters
Colby Granger, a character on the television series Numb3rs
Colby Thorne, a character on the soap opera Home and Away

See also
Colby (disambiguation), a disambiguation page for "Colby"
Colby (surname), a page for people with the surname "Colby"

English-language unisex given names
English masculine given names